Kitani Mohobbat Hai 2  is the second installment of Kitani Mohabbat Hai starring Kritika Kamra and Karan Kundra. The show begins with the story of Aarohi and Arjun torn between their warring families - a large joint family of police officers and lawyers, and a criminal family with ties to the underworld, respectively.

Plot
Pampered, Aarohi Ahluwalia belongs to a large Punjabi family of police background though her father is a lawyer. Arjun Singhania, an orphan lives with his foster father Rudra, a renowned Don who trains him to be his henchman in the criminal underworld.

Arjun kidnaps Aarohi under his father's orders, only for them to fall in love with each other while he keeps her captive, and also protects her from his own enemies in an encounter. However, her family soon finds her and Arjun's identity is disclosed. Feeling betrayed, Aarohi agrees to marry a silly NRI boy Cheeku. Arjun tries his best to get his criminal records cleared and win Aarohi's approval. After her grandfather grants him a clean chit, his sister - who is pregnant - goes to the Ahluwalia house to convince Aarohi, but is pushed off the stairs by her jealous best friend Gauri, who is also in love with Arjun.

The Singhanias blame the Ahluwalias for their daughter's miscarriage, and in an act of revenge, Arjun marries Aarohi and leaves her in the pandal, only for her to walk into the Singhania house and live with him as his wife, welcomed only by his grandmother, who is good friends with Aarohi's grandparents. Gradually, they begin to fall in love again amidst their several fights.

As Aarohi returns to her maternal house, it comes to light that Aarohi's grandfather committed a mistake which caused Arjun's mother's death. Arjun goes to kill Daddu in a fit of rage, but is emotionally stopped by Aarohi. On the other side, Mikhail, the Singhania's eldest son, who is jealous of the attention Arjun receives from their father, shoots Daddu, and Arjun is arrested. Aarohi tries to prove Arjun innocent, and later helps him escape, but is herself locked up by her uncles. Soon, Daddu wakes up and testifies for Arjun, and they are released. They visit Arjun's maternal home, but Mikhail reaches there and tries to kill Arjun. Aarohi's uncles also reach the location, arrest him,  and save them.

Arjun and Aarohi are finally united, and get married with the blessings of the entire family.

Cast

Main
Karan Kundrra as Arjun Singhania
Kritika Kamra as Aarohi Ahluwalia
Nitin Sahrawat as ACP Rajveer Singh Ahluwalia
Parul Gulati as Gauri Ahluwalia

Recurring
Mohan Kapoor as Rudra Pratap Singhania
 Puneet Tejwani as Cheeku
 Aaradhna Uppal as Kumud Singhania
Neelam Mehra as Teji Singhania
Danish Pandor as Mikhail Singhania
Mrinalini Tyagi as Raashi Singhania
Rupesh Kataria as Romit Singhania
Abhay Bhargava as Kartar Singh Ahluwalia
Alka Pradhan as Daljeet Kaur Ahluwalia
Saptrishi Ghosh as Arvind Singh Ahluwalia
 Hemaakshi Ujjain as Preeti Ahluwalia
 Farukh Saeed as Sudhir Singh Ahluwalia
Pyumori Mehta as Amrit Ahluwalia
Delnaaz Irani as Lovedeep Singh Ahluwalia
Loveleen Kaur Sasan 
 Areesz Gandhi as Jignesh
Sana Makbul as Shefali
Priya Chauhan as Simmi
Karan Arora as Billu
 Saurav Chakrabarti  as Danish Malhotra/Dhondu
Shardul Pandit as Jai
 Namrata Kharkar as Archana
Mohit Dagga as Advocate Ram Punjabi

References

Balaji Telefilms television series
Indian television soap operas
Indian television series
Imagine TV original programming
2010 Indian television seasons
2011 Indian television series endings
2010 Indian television series debuts